Longbow Games is a Canadian video game developer based in Toronto. It was founded in 1998 by Seumas McNally.

History 
Longbow Games was established in 1998 as Longbow Digital Arts by Seumas McNally. In 2000, the company's tank combat game Tread Marks won the top award at the Independent Games Festival. Shortly thereafter, McNally died of Hodgkin lymphoma aged 21. The Independent Games Festival renamed its grand price in his honour. Since then, Longbow is run by McNally's family, such as father Jim, brother Phillipe, and mother Wendy. In 2012, the company had seven employees and an intern, otherwise outsourcing tasks to subcontractors.

Projects 
Hegemony: Philip of Macedon was a pet project of Jim McNally, who became interested in Philip while researching Alexander the Great and discovering that it was actually his father who had developed the troop types, tactics and infrastructure that enabled Alexander's invasion of the Persian Empire. In hindsight, the early arcade games Longbow produced were mere stepping stones to the more in-depth real-time strategy games of the Hegemony series. In 2018, Longbow released the puzzle-adventure game Golem.

Finances 
A bottleneck has been financing, since independence from publishing firms meant being forced to rely on self-funding. However, as Longbow developed the game engine for Hegemony from scratch, it was eligible to receive research and development credit from the government. An export fund for sending Canadian companies abroad to promote their games supported Longbow to visit trade shows. With its title Hegemony Rome: The Rise of Caesar, Longbow attempted Steam Early Access to gain player feedback in 2013/14. In 2014/15, Longbow launched a crowdfunding campaign via Kickstarter for its next strategy title, Hegemony III: Clash of the Ancients, but raised only a fraction of its CA$30,000 goal.

Games 
 DX-Ball 2 and Rival Ball – a series of arcade games first released in 1996
 Tread Marks – a tank wargame, released in 2000.
 Hegemony - a strategy game series, which was started in 2010.
 Golem - a fantasy platform game, which was released in 2018.

References

External links 
 

Canadian companies established in 1998
Companies based in Toronto
Video game companies established in 1998
Video game companies of Canada
Video game development companies